The Australian National Drag Racing Association, or ANDRA for short, is a drag racing sanctioning body in Australia.

The organisation was created in 1973 from a more drag racing oriented faction of the Australian Hot Rod Federation.

Today ANDRA sanctions races throughout Australia.

It also manages the Summit Racing Equipment Sportsman Series - the calendar for which can be viewed here. - and also sanctions group one racing at select events, for example at the 2019 Westernationals where Top Doorslammer and Top Fuel Motorcycle competitors competed for a Gold ANDRA Christmas Tree trophy.

ANDRA Champions

ANDRA Drag Racing Series Champions 
ANDRA Drag Racing Series is made up of six group one classes which are all head ups pro tree drag racing.

Summit Racing Equipment Sportsman Series Champions

John Storm Memorial Trophy 
In memory of the first National Director of ANDRA John Storm, is an annual national award to sportsman competitor who scores the highest overall points from all rounds of the Summit sportsman series.

ANDRA Hall of Fame 
Dennis Syrmis
Graeme Cowin
Mick Atholwood
Paul Rogers Snr
George Bailey
Gary Miocevich
Jim Reed
Joe ‘Buzzard’ Gatt
John Taverna
Jim Read
Harry White
Larry Ormsby
Eddie Thomas

ANDRA National records

See also

Motorsport in Australia
List of Australian motor racing series
ANDRA Pro Series
ANDRA Top Fuel
2015/16 ANDRA Drag Racing Series
2016/17 ANDRA Drag Racing Series
2015/16 Summit Sportsman Series
2016/17 Summit Sportsman Series

References

External links

 https://web.archive.org/web/20160227012149/http://andra.com.au/series/andra-pro-series-champions.html
 https://web.archive.org/web/20160227012117/http://andra.com.au/series/points/andra-drag-racing-series.html
 https://web.archive.org/web/20160227012124/http://andra.com.au/series/points/summit-championship.html
 https://web.archive.org/web/20160427223713/http://www.andra.com.au/series/calendar/2015-16-calendar.html

Drag racing organizations
Dragin Australia
1973 establishments in Australia
Organizations established in 1973